Free forever can refer to:

A free-to-play online game that will never have a fee

See also

 Forever Free (disambiguation)